Baldwin V of Hainaut (1150 – 17 December 1195) was count of Hainaut (1171–1195), margrave of Namur as Baldwin I (1189–1195) and count of Flanders as Baldwin VIII (1191–1195).

History
He was the son of Baldwin IV, Count of Hainaut. In the winter of 1182 on 1183, the Count of Namur-Luxembourg was seriously ill and completely blind, whereupon Baldwin immediately visited him in Luxembourg. There he was reconfirmed as heir by his uncle and was able to receive the homage of several vassals from him. The succession was confirmed by Emperor Frederick I Barbarossa on 22 May 1184 at the Diet of Pentecost in Mainz, on which Baldwin acted as imperial sword bearer.
Flanders was acquired via his marriage to his widowed third cousin once removed Margaret I of Flanders, Countess of Flanders in 1169. Namur was acquired from his mother Alice of Namur. He was described as "The Count Baldwin with eyes of blue."

He was buried at the monastery of Saint Waudru before the altar of Blessed James the apostle.

Family
With Margaret, Baldwin had the following issue:

 Isabelle of Hainaut (Valenciennes, April 1170 – 15 March 1190, Paris), married king Philip II of France
 Baldwin VI of Hainaut (1171–1205), also count of Flanders and Latin Emperor
 Yolanda of Flanders (1175–1219), married Peter II of Courtenay, Latin Emperor
 Philip I of Namur (1175–1212)
 Henry of Flanders (1176–1216), Latin Emperor
 Sybille of Hainaut (1179 – 9 January 1217), married c. 1197 Guichard IV, Sire de Beaujeu (d. 1216)
 Eustace of Flanders (d. 1219), regent of the Kingdom of Thessalonica, married in 1209 to an unnamed daughter of Michael I Komnenos Doukas, ruler of Epirus
 Godfrey of Hainaut

See also
Counts of Hainaut family tree
Counts of Flanders family tree

References

Sources

House of Hainaut
Baldwin 8
Baldwin IV
Margraves of Namur
Hainaut, Baldwin V, Count of
Hainaut, Baldwin V, Count of
12th-century people from the county of Flanders